{{DISPLAYTITLE:C8H12N2}}
The molecular formula C8H12N2 (molar mass: 136.19 g/mol, exact mass: 136.100048) may refer to:

 Betahistine, an anti-vertigo drug
 Dimethyl-4-phenylenediamine
 Mebanazine
 Phenelzine
 Tetramethylpyrazine
 Tetramethylsuccinonitrile
 Xylylenediamines